Pizzo Peloso is a mountain in the Swiss Lepontine Alps, located west of Maggia in the canton of Ticino. It lies between the valleys of Vergeletto, Onsernone and Maggia. The closest higher summit is Pizzo Cramalina on the north-west side

References

External links
 Pizzo Peloso on Hikr

Mountains of the Alps
Mountains of Switzerland
Mountains of Ticino
Lepontine Alps